The Gabon national handball team represents the country in the international handball competitions.

African Nations Championship record

External links
IHF profile

Men's national handball teams
National sports teams of Gabon